The New Zealand School of Music—Te Kōkī, at Victoria University of Wellington (NZSM), is located in Wellington, New Zealand. NZSM provides a tertiary teaching faculty with programmes in Classical Performance, Jazz Performance, Music Studies, Composition and Sonic Arts. It also provides the only postgraduate degree course in Music therapy available in the country.  

Now fully owned by Victoria University of Wellington, the school was originally established in 2006 as a joint venture between Victoria University of Wellington and Massey University.  Te Kōkī (a reference to the 'Dawn Chorus') was chosen as the School's Māori name.  The NZSM combined the strengths of the former Conservatorium of Music at Massey, and Victoria University's School of Music and as a limited liability company with two equal shareholders, was governed by a board of directors.  

On 1 July 2014, the School transitioned to full Victoria University of Wellington ownership.

With a full tertiary programme and full range of degrees, NZSM has strengths in historical research, allowing a representation of scholarly expertise across multiple fields including musicology, opera studies, jazz, ethnomusicology, music and film, baroque and classical performance practice, contemporary performance, music technology, and electronic music.

References

External links

 Facebook
 

Music schools in New Zealand
Victoria University of Wellington
Massey University
Wellington City